Djevojka sa juga is the fourth studio album by Bosnian recording artist Maya Berovic released on 17 October 2012. Its Maya's first release under City Records, after she had left BN Music. The record was written and produced by several artists, most notably Damir Handanović.

The lead single, Leti ptico slobodno, was released with a music video on 25 June 2012. Music video for Mama mama was uploaded on 10 October 2012.

Track listing
Credits adapted from Discogs.

Personnel

Instruments

Dejan Kostić – backing vocals (1, 3, 4, 5, 6, 7, 8)
Ivana Selakov – backing vocals (1, 3, 4, 5, 6, 7, 8)
Ksenija Milošević – backing vocals (9)
Suzana Dinić – backing vocals (9, 10)
Dragan Kovačević Struja – accordion (1, 3, 4, 5, 6, 7, 8)
Aca Krsmanović – accordion (9)
Bane Vasić – accordion (10)
Damir Handanović – drum programming, keyboards (9)
Paja Vučković – guitar (1, 3, 4, 5, 6, 7, 8)
Ivan Bamby Mirković – guitar, bass guitar (9)
Petar Trumbetaš – guitar, bouzouki (10)

Production and recording

Oliver Jovanović – mastering
Lazar Milić – mixing (9)
Dragan Kovačević Struja – production, mixing, programming (1, 3, 4, 5, 6, 7, 8)
Dušan Glišić – programming (1, 3, 4, 5, 6, 7, 8)
Đorđe Janković – programming (1, 3, 4, 5, 6, 7, 8)
Đorđe Petrović – programming (10)
Vuk Zirojević – sound designing, mixing (10)

Crew

Andreja Damnjanović – photography
Dejan Milićević - photography, videography

Release history

References

2012 albums
Maya Berović albums
City Records albums